Sand Creek Station Golf Course just outside Newton, Kansas, is a links-style 18-hole public golf course with a bent grass playing surface designed by architect Jeff Brauer.

Unique features include an active railway running through the course, Sand Creek bordering four holes, and eleven custom ponds. A wooden cart bridge spans Sand Creek, and a concrete underpass allows carts to travel under the Burlington Northern Santa Fe railroad tracks. A biking/walking path runs along the tracks from the course to Southwest 14th Street.

Overview
The par-72 course spans 7,200 yards which sits on the native grass.

The course is one of the most highly acclaimed in Kansas; in 2007 Golfweek Magazine ranked Sand Creek Station as the second-best public course in the state, behind only Colbert Hills in Manhattan, Kansas.

Awards and honors

 Golf Digest ranked Sand Creek Station among 2006's best new public courses in America in its January 2008 issue.
 Golfweek Magazine named Sand Creek Station the No. 2 public course in the state of Kansas in March 2007.
 The Kansas chapter of the American Public Works Association named Sand Creek Station a Public Works Project of the Year in 2007.
 The National Golf Foundation honored Sand Creek Station with a Customer Loyalty Award in January 2007.
 GOLF Magazine recognized Sand Creek Station as a Top Ten New Course You Can Play in December 2006.
 Industry magazine Golf Inc. named Sand Creek Station as a finalist for top new public course in the country in November 2006.
 The American Council of Engineering Companies of Kansas awarded Sand Creek Station a City Public Improvement Award in November 2006.

External links
 Official site
 Kemper Sports Management
 City of Newton

References

Golf clubs and courses in Kansas
Buildings and structures in Harvey County, Kansas
Tourist attractions in Harvey County, Kansas